The Geelong Symphony Orchestra is a 60-member symphony orchestra based in Geelong, Victoria, Australia. Geelong Symphony Orchestra gave their debut concert on February 26, 2016 and give 3 concerts annually in Deakin University's Costa Hall.

External links
Official Geelong Symphony Orchestra website
Music Australia: Geelong has a new symphony orchestra

Symphony orchestras

Musical groups from Geelong